Pinball is a type of physical arcade game with a metal ball.

Pinball may also refer to:

Music
 Pinball (album), by Marius Neset, 2015
 "Pinball" (song), by Brian Protheroe, 1974

Video games

 Pinball (1980 video game), a computer game for the TRS-80
 Pinball (1984 video game), a game for the Nintendo Entertainment System (NES)
 Pinball, a 1979 Microvision game

Other Uses
 Pinball (file system), the OS/2 HPFS file system
 Pinball (helicopter), nickname of the Bell P-63 Kingcobra when used as a live gunnery target
 Pinball (journal), an online literary magazine
 Pinball Clemons (born 1965), Canadian Football League player, coach, and executive
 Pinball, a sport on the TV series Robot and Monster
 Pinball, a fictional Marvel Comics character in the Squadron Supreme

See also
 Pinball museum (disambiguation)